Molla Sara Rural District is a rural district (dehestan) in the Central District of Shaft County, Gilan Province, Iran. At the 2006 census, its population was 12,596, in 3,308 families. The rural district has 17 villages.

References 

Rural Districts of Gilan Province
Shaft County